Édgar Osvaldo Barreto Cáceres (born 15 July 1984) is a Paraguayan former professional footballer who played as a central midfielder.

After starting his career with Cerro Porteño in his homeland and NEC in the Dutch Eredivisie, Barreto spent the vast majority of his career in Italy's Serie A. He made over 260 appearances in the competition, in service of Reggina, Atalanta, Palermo and Sampdoria, and retiring in 2022 after two seasons back in the Netherlands at NEC.

Barreto earned 60 caps for the Paraguay national team from 2004 to 2011. After winning a silver medal at the 2004 Olympics, he played for the country at three Copa América tournaments and two FIFA World Cups, finishing as runner-up in the 2011 Copa América.

Club career
Barreto started his career with Paraguayan club Cerro Porteño, debuting in the 2002 season. The following year he made his debut in the Copa Libertadores.

in January 2004, he signed with Eredivisie club NEC Nijmegen.

In the summer of 2007, Barreto agreed to a four-year contract with Reggina Calcio. He played an integral part in keeping Reggina in Serie A at the end of the 2007–08 season, earning a reputation for scoring long range goals. In summer 2009, after Reggina moved to Serie B, he was sold to Atalanta Bergamo.

At Atalanta, Barreto missed most of his first season through injury, only returning in the last days of the season and not being able to avoid the relegation of his club in Serie B. His excellent performances in Serie B afforded the interest Napoli during the January market. He contributed to the promotion of the Bergamaschi to Serie A in the 2010–11 season, at the end of which he was voted into "Top 11 Serie B" players team by Italian journalists.

On 31 August 2011, Barreto moved to Palermo on a four-year contract while a transfer fee of €5.3 million was paid to Atalanta.

On 1 July 2015, Barreto signed a contract with U.C. Sampdoria.

During an interview in July 2017, Barreto affirmed that he would not return to Paraguayan football due to family reasons, although he recognized that his time at Cerro Porteño was fundamental for his career.

In May 2020 he agreed the termination of his contract with Sampdoria.

Return to NEC
Upon Barreto's contract termination with Sampadoria, NEC's fans had dreamed and expressed his return.
Barreto actually owned a house and three apartments that he leased in the city of Nijmegen, which was also a destination venue for his family during vacations and, on more than one occasion, Barreto manifested his wish to return to the club. NEC's fans had placed a banner at the entry of the club's stadium asking Barreto to return as NEC's general manager, Wilco van Schaik, lifted the fan's hopes of Barreto returning to the club. Van Schaik had told Dutch magazine Voetbal International that Barreto was an important player in NEC and still held a lot of weight in the city, with the club expressing interest in the player since the month of May.

On 15 July 2020, on his 36th birthday and after 13 years in Italian football, Barreto returned to his first European club NEC in the Dutch second tier. Barreto signed a season-long contract with the option of extending for another season.

In August 2020, Barreto played his first match of the season in a 2–0 defeat to Cambuur.

On 15 May 2022, he announced his retirement from football, while stating his desire to start a managerial career.

International career
Barreto debuted for the Paraguay national football team in a 1–0 win over Costa Rica on 8 June at the 2004 Copa América. He played all four games as his team reached the quarter-finals. Weeks later, he was part of their squad that took home a silver medal at the 2004 Olympics in Greece. On 4 August, before the Summer Olympics began, he played in a preparation game against the Portugal of Cristiano Ronaldo in the city of Algarve, resulting in a 5–0 defeat.

On 17 August 2005, Barreto scored his first international goal to open a 3–0 friendly win over El Salvador in Ciudad del Este. Coach Anibal Ruiz called him up for the 2006 FIFA World Cup in Germany.

At the 2007 Copa América in Venezuela, Barreto again played all four matches of a quarter-final finish. He scored to open a 3–1 win over the United States in the group stage. At the 2010 FIFA World Cup in South Africa, he came on in the 75th minute against Japan in the last 16 and scored the first attempt in the penalty shootout, as Paraguay advanced to the next round for the first time.

Barreto was also in Gerardo Martino's squad that came runners-up to the hosts at the 2011 Copa América in Uruguay. Again on as a substitute in the quarter-finals against holders Brazil, he took the first penalty after another goalless draw, sending it wide in an eventual triumph.

On 5 August 2012, Barreto announced his international retirement for the Albirroja. He said that he could no longer combine the long journeys with competing in Serie A.

Personal life
Barreto is the younger brother of goalkeeper Diego Barreto, who was his international teammate.

Career statistics

Club

International

Scores and results list Paraguay's goal tally first, score column indicates score after each Barreto goal.

Honours
Paraguay U23
 Silver Medal at the Summer Olympics: 2004 Athens

References

External links
 
 
 

1984 births
Living people
Sportspeople from Asunción
Association football midfielders
Paraguayan footballers
Cerro Porteño players
NEC Nijmegen players
Reggina 1914 players
Atalanta B.C. players
Palermo F.C. players
U.C. Sampdoria players
Paraguayan Primera División players
Eredivisie players
Eerste Divisie players
Serie A players
Serie B players
Paraguay youth international footballers
Paraguay under-20 international footballers
Paraguay international footballers
Olympic footballers of Paraguay
Footballers at the 2004 Summer Olympics
Olympic silver medalists for Paraguay
2004 Copa América players
2006 FIFA World Cup players
2007 Copa América players
2010 FIFA World Cup players
2011 Copa América players
Paraguayan expatriate footballers
Paraguayan expatriate sportspeople in the Netherlands
Expatriate footballers in the Netherlands
Paraguayan expatriate sportspeople in Italy
Expatriate footballers in Italy
Olympic medalists in football
Medalists at the 2004 Summer Olympics